The 2012 Campeonato Internacional de Tênis do Estado do Pará was a professional tennis tournament played on hard courts. It was the first edition of the tournament which was part of the 2012 ATP Challenger Tour. It took place in Belém, Brazil between 1 and 7 October 2012.

Singles main-draw entrants

Seeds

 1 Rankings are as of September 24, 2012.

Other entrants
The following players received wildcards into the singles main draw:
  Fabrício Neis
  José Pereira
  Nicolas Santos
  João Pedro Sorgi

The following players received entry from the qualifying draw:
  Marcus Daniell
  Cătălin-Ionuț Gârd
  Nicholas Monroe
  John Peers

Champions

Singles

 Ricardo Hocevar def.  Thiemo de Bakker, 7–6(7–1), 7–6(7–4)

Doubles

 John Peers /  John-Patrick Smith def.  Nicholas Monroe /  Simon Stadler, 6–3, 6–2

External links
Official Website

Campeonato Internacional de Tenis de Campinas
Campeonato Internacional de Tênis do Estado do Pará